Sillim or Sillim-dong is a statutory division of Gwanak District, Seoul, South Korea. Seoul National University and Nokdu Street are located in the town. Its name means "new forest", which was derived from the woods outstretched from Mt. Gwanak. It consists 11 administrative neighbourhoods.

In a survey conducted in 2011 by the Ministry of Land, Transport and Maritime Affairs on 92 Administrative divisions across the country, it reported that the bus stops in Sillim-dong are among the busiest in the country.

Administrative divisions
As of September, 2008, there are 11 administrative neighborhoods (dong) in Sillim.

Attractions
 Seoul National University
Kyujanggak Archives
Seoul National University Museum of Art
 Horim Museum
 Sundae Town

Traffic
 Sillim Station
Street Nambu, Street Sillim

See also 
Administrative divisions of South Korea

References

External links
Official website
Map of the area at the official website

Neighbourhoods of Gwanak-gu